Amparihitsokatra is a town and commune in Madagascar. It belongs to the district of Ambatondrazaka, which is a part of Alaotra-Mangoro Region. The population of the commune was estimated to be approximately 10,000 in 2001 commune census.

Only primary schooling is available. The majority 70% of the population of the commune are farmers.  The most important crops are rice and peanuts, while other important agricultural products are maize and cassava.  Additionally fishing employs 30% of the population.

References and notes 

Populated places in Alaotra-Mangoro